Monieaga Bagus Suwardi (born 11 October 1990) is an Indonesian professional footballer who plays as a forward for Liga 2 club Persekat Tegal.

Club career

Sriwijaya
In 2019, Monieaga signed a contract with Indonesian Liga 2 club Sriwijaya.

Persijap Jepara
He was signed for Persijap Jepara to play in Liga 2 in the 2020 season. This season was suspended on 27 March 2020 due to the COVID-19 pandemic. The season was abandoned and was declared void on 20 January 2021.

Persekat Tegal
In 2021, Monieaga signed a contract with Indonesian Liga 2 club Persekat Tegal. He made his league debut on 27 September in a 3–1 win against Badak Lampung, and he also scored his first goal for Persekat in the 53rd minute at the Gelora Bung Karno Madya Stadium, Jakarta.

References

External links
 Monieaga Suwardi at Soccerway
 Monieaga Suwardi at Liga Indonesia

1990 births
Living people
Indonesian footballers
Persijap Jepara players
Association football forwards
People from Sleman Regency